Laura "Lolli" Pirovano (born 20 November 1997) is an Italian World Cup alpine ski racer, and specializes in the speed events of downhill and super-G.

Biography
On 9 January 2021 at age 23, Pirovano achieved her first top-five result in a World Cup event, finishing fifth in a downhill at St. Anton, Austria.

World Cup results

Season standings

Top five results
0 podiums; 3 top fives, 7 top tens

World Championship results

References

External links
 
 

1997 births
Living people
Italian female alpine skiers
Alpine skiers of Fiamme Gialle
Sportspeople from Trento